The Clackamas Wilderness is a wilderness area located in the Mount Hood National Forest in the northwestern Cascades of Oregon, United States. The wilderness is made up of five different tracts of lands with no roads on a  stretch on both sides of the Clackamas River. These areas include Big Bottom, Memaloose Lake, Clackamas Canyon, Sisi Butte and South Fork Clackamas. It has some of the biggest trees in northwest Oregon. Memaloose Lake is a very popular hiking trail that leads through a forest to the lake, and then continues a mile up to a viewpoint on to up South Fork Mountain.

References

External links
 Photo of Whale Creek in the wilderness by Philip A. Knouf

Wilderness areas of Oregon
Mount Hood National Forest
Protected areas established in 2009
2009 establishments in Oregon